Ignacio Tuason Arroyo Jr. (October 24, 1950 – January 26, 2012), also known as Iggy Arroyo, was a Filipino politician.  He was a member of the Philippine House of Representatives representing the Fifth District of Negros Occidental from 2004. He is the brother of former First Gentleman, Jose Miguel Arroyo.

Early life
He was born on October 24, 1950, in Quezon City to Ignacio Lacson Arroyo, Sr. and Lourdes Tuason-Arroyo. His siblings include former Philippine First Gentleman Jose Miguel "Mike" Arroyo and former congresswoman Ma. Lourdes "Marilou" Arroyo-Lesaca.

Arroyo had daughters named Bernardina Arroyo-Tantoco and Bianca Arroyo from his first wife Marilyn Jacinto. He was married to his second wife Alicia "Aleli" Morales and is father to Alelu Arroyo.

Profile
Congressman Ignacio T. Arroyo Jr. was elected as Congressman during his first try in politics in 2004 and in 2007, he was again chosen by his constituents in the 5th District of Negros Occidental. During the 13th Congress, he became the Vice-Chairman of the House Committees on Agriculture and Appropriations and Member of other various Committees. He is presently the Chairman of the House Committee on Environment and Natural Resources, Vice-Chairman of the House Committee on Government Reorganization and Member of other various Committees.

His early education began in Ateneo de Manila University in Quezon City. He finished High School in 1969 at Villanova Preparatory High School in Ojai, California, USA and he took his preparatory course in Menlo College in Palo Alto, California then he went on to pursue his Bachelor of Science in Business Administration degree, Major in Finance at the University of San Francisco, California, USA where he graduated in 1974 with flying colors.

Prior to his election as Representative of the 5th District of Negros Occidental, he was a Board Member of the Philippine Producers Corporation (PHILPROCOM) in Bacolod City as well as the Planters Association of Negros Occidental.

He was actively involved in Rotary Club of Bacolod-East and Brotherhood of Christian Businessmen and Professionals. As the Representative of his district, his priority is to respond to the needs of his constituents by providing them high impact infrastructure projects and places high value on the youth and children as the hope of this country in these trying times. He is affectionately called “Iggy” by his constituents.

He has proposed an act to promote environmental awareness through environmental education, which was signed into law as Republic Act No. 9512 otherwise known as the National Environmental Awareness and Education Act of 2008. He wants to instill to the youth the value of protecting our environment which means protecting their future. He likewise authored the Philippine Climate Change Act of 2008, which created the Climate Change Commission.

Among other significant bills, he has authored acts on increasing the salary grades of public school teachers, Seafarers Act of 2008, giving scholarship to the youth engaged in agriculture, instituting the children's welfare funds for the protection and rehabilitation of abandoned, abused and sexually exploited children, the anti-child pornography act, Magna Carta for Day Care workers, establishing drug rehabilitation in every region in the country and granting incentives and benefits to rural health workers.

Education
Bachelor of Science in Business Administration, Major in Finance University of San Francisco, California, United States
Year Graduated: 1974
Dean's List, Villanova Preparatory High School, Ojai, California, United States
Year Graduated: 1969
Ateneo de Manila University, Quezon City
Year Graduated: 1965

Ancestry

Death
Early on January 26, 2012, his brother Mike Arroyo announced that Iggy died before afternoon Philippine Standard Time (PST). With this, the Philippine flag in Batasan Pambansa was later put to half-mast. However, the chief of staff of Iggy Arroyo later released an advisory that he is not dead but he is currently under life support and declared "brain dead", or clinically dead. And they later rolled up the Philippine flag after two hours at half-mast. On the evening of that day, 6pm PST it was announced that the 5th representative of Negros Occidental representative Iggy Arroyo had died because the life support was already removed. This was confirmed by his brother and his chief of staff who received the message from love ones of Iggy Arroyo from London. Arroyo was survived by girlfriend and live-in partner Grace Ibuna. It can be remembered that Iggy went to London late last year to seek treatment for liver ailment.

References

External links
Official website: 

1950 births
2012 deaths
Filipino Roman Catholics
People from Negros Occidental
Hiligaynon people
Ignacio
Members of the House of Representatives of the Philippines from Negros Occidental
University of San Francisco alumni
People from Quezon City
Lakas–CMD politicians
Burials at the Manila North Cemetery